Charles Gray (born Donald Marshall Gray; 28 August 1928 – 7 March 2000) was an English actor and voice artist who was well known for roles including the arch-villain Ernst Stavro Blofeld in the James Bond film Diamonds Are Forever; Dikko Henderson in a previous Bond film, You Only Live Twice; Sherlock Holmes's brother Mycroft Holmes in The Adventures of Sherlock Holmes; and The Criminologist in The Rocky Horror Picture Show.

Early life
Gray was born in Bournemouth, Hampshire, the son of surveyor Donald Gray (died 1975), who had served as a Captain in the Royal Engineers, and Maude Elizabeth (née Marshall). Gray attended Bournemouth School alongside Benny Hill, whose school had been evacuated to the same buildings, during the Second World War. Some of his friends remember that his bedroom walls were plastered with pictures of film stars.

Stage career

By his mid-twenties, Gray had left his first job as a clerk for an estate agent to become an actor. He began his stage experience at the theatre club next to the Palace Court Hotel in Bournemouth, where he was a last-minute cast replacement in The Beaux' Stratagem. Gray surprised everyone, including himself, with the quality of his performance. He moved away from Bournemouth in the late 1950s, but his parents remained at the family home until their deaths.

On becoming a professional actor he had to change his name, as there was already an actor named Donald Gray. He chose Charles Gray partly because Charles was the name of his maternal grandfather, partly because he had a close friend named Charles, and partly because he thought it sounded nice. For his first appearance on Broadway, in the 1961 musical Kean, he went under the name Oliver Gray.

Charles Gray distinguished himself in theatrical roles, in the Regent's Park Open Air Theatre, London, at the Royal Shakespeare Company, Stratford-Upon-Avon and at the Old Vic. He received his vocal training at the RSC and became noted for his imposing presence.

Film and television

During the 1960s, Gray established himself as a successful character actor and made many appearances on British television. Work in this period included Danger Man, with Patrick McGoohan, and Maigret. Gray also appeared opposite Laurence Olivier in the film version of The Entertainer (1960) as a reporter. He played Jack Baker that same year in the Perry Mason episode, "The Case of the Bullied Bowler".

His breakthrough year was 1967, when he starred with Peter O'Toole and Omar Sharif in the Second World War murder-mystery film The Night of the Generals. The same year, he played Dikko Henderson, a British intelligence officer assigned to their Embassy in Tokyo, in the Bond film You Only Live Twice (1967). Four years later, he appeared as Ernst Stavro Blofeld in the James Bond film Diamonds Are Forever (1971), both films starring Sean Connery as James Bond.

Gray's most prolific work as an actor was between 1968 and 1979, when he appeared in more than forty major film and television productions. From this period, he is perhaps best known for portraying the Criminologist (the narrator) in The Rocky Horror Picture Show and a similar character, Judge Oliver Wright, in its sequel Shock Treatment (1981). This more expansive role is said to be the same character (the Criminologist in The Rocky Horror Picture Show is not named). In 1973, he played Lord Seacroft in the television series The Upper Crusts opposite Margaret Leighton, and in 1983, he starred alongside Coral Browne and Alan Bates in the award-winning made-for-TV film An Englishman Abroad. In 1985, he starred in an episode of the BBC-TV detective series Bergerac, entitled "What Dreams May Come?". Other well-known film work includes The Devil Rides Out, Mosquito Squadron, Cromwell and The Beast Must Die. In 1991, Gray co-starred with Oliver Tobias in the science-fiction film Firestar – First Contact for Ice International Films.

Later work
Gray portrayed Mycroft Holmes in both the film The Seven-Per-Cent Solution (1976) and opposite Jeremy Brett's Sherlock in four episodes of the Granada Television series The Adventures of Sherlock Holmes (1984). In two episodes of the final Brett series, The Memoirs of Sherlock Holmes, he had leading roles as Mycroft, the first because Edward Hardwicke, who played Doctor Watson, was busy on another project and the second as a result of Brett's illness.

Other television appearances included roles in Dennis Potter's Blackeyes, The New Statesman, Thriller, Upstairs, Downstairs, Bergerac, Porterhouse Blue plus a range of Shakespearean roles, such as Caesar in Julius Caesar and Pandarus in Troilus and Cressida. He dubbed for Jack Hawkins in the film Theatre of Blood and others after Hawkins's larynx was removed to combat throat cancer.

Death
Gray died of cancer in a London hospital on 7 March 2000 at the age of 71.

Selected filmography

 I Accuse! (1958) as Capt. Brossard
 Heart of a Child (1958) as Fritz Heiss
 Official Detective (1958) Episode: "Extortion" as King 
 The Desperate Man (1959) as Dawson
 Follow a Star (1959) as Taciturn Man at Party (uncredited)
 Tommy the Toreador (1959) as Gomez
 The Entertainer (1960) as Columnist
 Man in the Moon (1960) as Leo
 Masquerade (1965) as Benson
 The Night of the Generals (1967) as General Herbert von Seidlitz-Gabler
 You Only Live Twice (1967) as Dikko Henderson
 The Man Outside (1967) as Charles Griddon
 The Secret War of Harry Frigg (1968) as Gen. Adrian Cox-Roberts
 The Devil Rides Out (1968) as Mocata
 The Nine Ages of Nakedness (1969) as Narrator (voice)
 The File of the Golden Goose (1969) as The Owl
 Mosquito Squadron (1969) as Air Commodore Hufford
 The Executioner (1970) as Vaughan Jones
 Cromwell (1970) as The Earl of Essex
 When Eight Bells Toll (1971) as Sir Anthony Skouras (voice, uncredited)
 Diamonds Are Forever (1971) as Ernst Stavro Blofeld
 Theatre of Blood (1973) as Solomon Psaltery (voice, uncredited)
 Tales That Witness Madness (1973) as Jack Hawkins Voice Double (voice, uncredited)
 On the Game (1974) as Narrator (voice)
 The Beast Must Die (1974) as Bennington
 Fall of Eagles (1974) as Mikhail Rodzianko
 The Rocky Horror Picture Show (1975) as The Criminologist – An Expert
 Seven Nights in Japan (1976) as Henry Hollander
 The Seven-Per-Cent Solution (1976) as Mycroft Holmes
 Three Dangerous Ladies as Mr. Santander (segment: The Island)
 Silver Bears (1978) as Charles Cook
 Richard II (1978) as Duke of York
 The Legacy (1978) as Karl Liebnecht
 The Mirror Crack'd (1980) as Bates, The Butler
 Ticket to Heaven (1981) as Musician
 Shock Treatment (1981) as Judge Oliver Wright
 Charles & Diana: A Royal Love Story (1982) as John Spencer, 8th Earl Spencer
 The Jigsaw Man (1983) as Sir James Chorley
 The Gourmet (1984) as Manley Kingston
  (1990) as Satan
 Firestar: First Contact (1991) as Commodore Vandross
 The Beano Video (1993) as Narrator #4 (voice)
 The Tichborne Claimant (1998) as Arundell

Notes

References

External links
 
 Obituary in The Guardian
 
 

1928 births
2000 deaths
Deaths from cancer in England
English male film actors
English male stage actors
English male television actors
English male musical theatre actors
People educated at Bournemouth School
Actors from Bournemouth
20th-century English male actors